David Bernard Coleman (born 5 March 1974) is an Australian politician. He is a member of the Liberal Party and was elected to the House of Representatives at the 2013 federal election, holding the New South Wales seat of Banks. Coleman served as the Assistant Minister to the Prime Minister for Mental Health and Suicide Prevention from December 2020 until May 2022. He previously served as Minister for Immigration, Citizenship, Migrant Services and Multicultural Affairs in the Morrison Government from August 2018, although in December 2019 he took indefinite leave for personal reasons. He had earlier served as Assistant Minister for Finance in the Turnbull Government from 2017 to 2018.

Early life and education
Coleman studied at the University of New South Wales, where he graduated with a Bachelor of Arts and Bachelor of Laws, and was president of the UNSW Student Guild in 1997.

Career
Before entering politics, Coleman worked for global management consulting firm McKinsey & Co, LookSmart, dStore, and since 2005, in a variety of roles for PBL Media and the Nine Network where he was the director of strategy and digital. Coleman entered Liberal preselection contests for Cook in 2007 and Bradfield in 2010; but he was unsuccessful in receiving Liberal endorsement. Before his election to Parliament, Coleman held directorships with ninemsn Pty Limited (2008–13), Australian News Channel Pty Limited (2008–13), and Yellow Brick Road Holdings Limited (2011–13).

At the 2013 federal election Coleman defeated the incumbent Labor member for Banks, Daryl Melham, who had held the seat for 23 years. Coleman recorded a two-party preferred swing of 3.28 points in his favour; and became the first non-Labor member to hold the seat since the Division of Banks was created in 1949.

Ministerial career
Coleman was appointed Assistant Minister for Finance in December 2017, in the Second Turnbull Ministry. In the August 2018 leadership spills, he reportedly supported Malcolm Turnbull in the first vote and Scott Morrison in the second. He was subsequently appointed Minister for Immigration, Citizenship and Multicultural Affairs in the First Morrison Ministry. After the government's re-election at the 2019 election, his title was changed to Minister for Immigration, Citizenship, Migrant Services and Multicultural Affairs.

In December 2019, it was announced that Coleman would be taking indefinite leave for personal reasons, with Alan Tudge taking over his portfolio as acting minister. He formally remained as a minister until a December 2020 reshuffle, in which he was instead appointed Assistant Minister to the Prime Minister for Mental Health and Suicide Prevention. He served in this portfolio until May 2022, following the appointment of the Albanese ministry.

Political views
Coleman is a member of the Moderate/Modern Liberal faction of the Liberal Party.

Coleman was in favour of legalising same-sex marriage in the 2017 postal survey.

Personal life
Coleman is married to Dotte Derrickson and they have two children.

References

External links
 Coleman's OpenAustralia page

1974 births
Living people
Lawyers from Sydney
Liberal Party of Australia members of the Parliament of Australia
Politicians from Sydney
University of New South Wales Law School alumni
Members of the Australian House of Representatives for Banks
Members of the Australian House of Representatives
21st-century Australian politicians
Turnbull Government
Government ministers of Australia
Morrison Government